"G.T.O." is a song written by John Wilkin and first recorded as the 1964 debut single of his band, Ronny & the Daytonas. It was also featured on their album of the same name. The single reached No. 4 on the Billboard Hot 100 chart on September 26, 1964, and sold over one million copies, being awarded a gold disc. It was produced by Bill Justis. The song's lyrics extol the performance of the Pontiac GTO and express the singer's desire to buy one.

References

1964 singles
1964 songs